Korey Alexander Sheridan Smith (born 31 January 1991) is an English professional footballer who plays as a midfielder for EFL League One club Derby County.

Early life
Smith was "discovered plying his trade on the Sunday league park pitches". He became the captain of Norwich City Academy, and led them on a run in the FA Youth Cup. He has two younger sisters, Harriet and Alice. He is of Jamaican descent.

Career
Smith first appeared on the bench for Norwich City in January 2008 as an unused substitute in an FA Cup match against Charlton Athletic. He made his professional debut in a 0–1 defeat to Sheffield Wednesday at Carrow Road on 4 April 2009, as an 82nd-minute substitute for David Carney.

Smith featured regularly in the Norwich team during the 2009–10 season as they won promotion from League One to the Championship as champions.

In July 2010, Smith was handed the number 18 shirt and continued to play regularly as Norwich won promotion to the Premier League.

In January 2012, Smith penned a one-month loan deal at Barnsley. He made an instant impact
at Oakwell, assisting two goals on debut against Derby County in a 3–2 victory
for the Reds on his 21st birthday.

In September 2012, Smith signed on a 93-day emergency loan at League One club Yeovil Town, making his debut as a substitute away at MK Dons in a 1–0 defeat.

On 15 March 2013, Smith signed on loan with Oldham Athletic until the end of the season.

Oldham Athletic
Smith signed a permanent two-year deal with Oldham Athletic on 20 June 2013, after being released by Norwich City having been at the club for seven years. Smith was made captain of Oldham Athletic after manager Lee Johnson said Smith was as brave as a lion, brave on the ball and can take the ball anywhere.
He scored his first goal for the club with a stunning strike in the FA Cup 2013–14 second round against Mansfield Town.

Smith scored his first league goal for the club in a 1–1 draw against Leyton Orient, scoring in added time to bring the scores level and earn the club a point away against the then third in the division Leyton Orient with a fantastic chipped effort from 30 yards out.

Bristol City
Smith signed a three-year deal with Bristol City on 27 June 2014 for an undisclosed fee. He scored his first goals for Bristol City when he scored twice in a 3–1 Football League Trophy win against Cheltenham Town on 8 October 2014. He helped Bristol City to a Football League Trophy and League One double in his first season with the club. Smith started 38 times the following season, as Bristol City finished 18th, meaning they avoided relegation straight back to League One. Smith underwent ankle surgery in April, returning to full training on 5 September 2016.

On 20 December 2017, Smith scored a last minute winner as Bristol City upset Premier League side Manchester United 2–1 in the EFL Cup quarter-finals at Ashton Gate.

Smith left Bristol City on 9 August 2020 after spending six years with the club.

Swansea City
On 14 August 2020, Smith joined Swansea City on a two-year contract. It was confirmed that Smith would leave the club upon the expiration of his contract at the end of the 2021–22 season.

Derby County
On 16 July 2022, Smith dropped down to League One to join newly relegated Derby County on a two-year contract.

Personal life
He's married with three kids. His brother in law is England Rugby player Joe Launchbury (their wives are sisters).

Career statistics

Honours
Norwich City

 Football League One: 2009-10
 Football League Championship Runner-Up: 2010-11

Bristol City
Football League One: 2014–15
Football League Trophy: 2014–15

Individual
PFA Team of the Year: 2014–15 League One

References

External links

1991 births
Living people
People from Hatfield, Hertfordshire
English footballers
Association football midfielders
Norwich City F.C. players
Barnsley F.C. players
Yeovil Town F.C. players
Oldham Athletic A.F.C. players
Bristol City F.C. players
Swansea City A.F.C. players
Derby County F.C. players
English Football League players
English people of Jamaican descent
Black British sportspeople